Teseo riconosciuto is the 1798 first opera seria by Gaspare Spontini to a libretto by Cosimo Giotti. It was premiered at the Teatro della Pallacorda of the Accademia degli Intrepidi, Florence, then at the Teatro Alfieri on Via Pietrapiana.

Cast
Egeo, 
Teseo, 
Asteria, 
Medea, 
Connida, 
Evandro, 
Leucippe, 
Ombra d'Etra

Recording
Carlo Allemano, Diego D'Auria, Sonia Visentin, Paoletta Marrocu, Stefano Rinaldi, Miliani Carlo Bosi, and Daniela Piccini. Alberto Zedda 1995

References

Operas by Gaspare Spontini
Italian-language operas
1798 operas
Operas